"Girl Like Me" (stylized in all caps) is a song by American group Black Eyed Peas and Colombian singer and songwriter Shakira. Originally conceived in 2008 and later considered for will.i.am's fourth studio album #willpower (2013), the song was released on the Black Eyed Peas' eighth studio album, Translation (2020). It was released on December 4, 2020 alongside a Rich Lee-directed music video. The track was written by the Black Eyed Peas, Shakira, Brendan Buckley, Johnny Goldstein, Albert Menendez, and Tim Mitchell and was produced by the group's member will.i.am, Shakira, and Johnny Goldstein. The song was praised for its "anthemic" nature and Shakira's vocals were compared to those she used in her eighth studio album She Wolf (2009). Commercially, the single reached the top ten in twelve countries.

Background and release
"Girl Like Me" was written by will.i.am, apl.de.ap, Taboo, Shakira, Brendan Buckley, Johnny Goldstein, Albert Menendez, and Tim Mitchell, while being produced by will.i.am and co-pruduced by Shakira and Johnny Goldstein. will.i.am started working on the song with Shakira in October 2008. Will.i.am tried to re-work the song for his fourth studio album #willpower in 2010, but the track again failed to be included.

In January 2020, on a video studio session with Johny Goldstein, the song began to get a new shape with the "right combination of sonics and rhythm". Will.i.am in an interview with NME said that he "refreshed it, and called Shakira, and we wrote new lyrics and she helped me with my Spanish." In ETOnline he complimented Shakira by saying "she comes with notes, and it's awesome. But she does it in a very gentle, humble, sweet way, to where you just wanna please all of her concerns." Shakira commented that "she really loved working with Black Eyed Peas", saying that "Will[.i.am] knows how detail-oriented I am and was so patient and meticulous with me and making sure we had the absolute best sound possible." "Girl like Me" was finally included in Black Eyed Peas' eight studio album Translation (2020).

On June 19, 2020 Black Eyed Peas revealed an alternative cover art for the single, featuring a drawn black silhouette of Shakira in a raspberry rose ellipse and teal background, and on December 3 they showed the same cover but with a white background. The same day both acts announced through their social media that the song's music video would be released on December 4. The song was sent to contemporary hit radio stations in Italy on December 11. On February 26, 2021 twocolors remix of song was released.

Composition and lyrics
"Girl like Me" is a song sung and rapped in English and Spanish. The track was composed in E minor key and tempo of 124 BPM. It starts with the chorus sang in English by Shakira, where she used vocals compared to those from her 2009 studio album She Wolf. The first verse is rapped by will.i.am, where he switches from English to Spanish multiple times throughout the verse. After the second and last chorus, there is a bridge sung by Shakira in Spanish. In his verse, Taboo makes a reference to Shakira's smash hit "Hips Don't Lie" in the line "Your hips don’t lie, they rock me", when apl.de.ap references late Latin singer Selena and Brazilian singer Anitta. The song has been described as "anthemic" or "empowering" by many publications.

Reception

A.D. Amorosi of Variety said in a review for the Black Eyed Peas album Translation, that "Shakira turns an anthemic dance-floor spiel into something weirdly intimate." Mike Wass of Idolator called the song an "addictive bop" and added that "All in all, 'Girl Like Me' sounds like a smash. It’s a summery, feel-good call to the dance floor with a little Latin spice and a radio-friendly chorus." Entertainment Weeklys Et Más called a song "Latina-empowering track".

"Girl like Me" became an instant viral hit on YouTube, racking up 23 million views in 3 days and 200 million in less than two months. The song also sparked a viral challenge on TikTok where users challenged themselves to recreate the video's choreography. In the United States, the song debuted on Billboards Digital Songs in December 2020 at number 37. It later debuted in Hot 100 chart at number 87 on week ending January 16, 2021. The song ultimately peaked at number 67 on its sixth charting week on February 27, 2021. The song became Shakira's 22nd and Black Eyed Peas' 19th Hot 100 entry. The song topped Billboard's Latin Airplay chart on the week of March 13, 2021. Girl Like Me eventually was certified gold by RIAA for selling over 500,000 units in the country. 

The song reached the top 10 in several Latin charts, including Mexico where it peaked at number four and was certified platinum and goldfor selling over 210 thousand copies. In Europe, the song reached the top 5 in Belgian region of Wallonia, France, and Romania. In Africa, the song topped the North African Airplay charts.

Music video
The music video for "Girl like Me" was filmed in September 2020 and was released on December 4, 2020 at 10 AM in Eastern Time Zone. The music video was directed by Rich Lee, who earlier directed music video for "Imma Be Rocking That Body" (2010). While speaking to Billboard about the video, Shakira said: "The song already has that vintage quality to it, so I wanted a video that had the retro futuristic vibe. From the beginning I thought: Jane Fonda. Those '80s workout videos had a really cool aesthetic I wanted to import into this video."

The video features Shakira on a skateboard and with backup dancers doing aerobics. It also features Black Eyed Peas in a set singing the song. Shakira's appearance has been compared to Wonder Woman. The choreography in the video went viral on TikTok where fans attempted to recreate Shakira's dance moves. In just 5 days, TikTok videos using "Girl like Me" choreography accumulated 40 million views. The music video received 23 million views in its first three days. In January 2021, the music video passed 200 million views on YouTube.

Track listing
Streaming
"Girl like Me" – 3:43

Digital download and streaming – twocolors remix
"Girl like Me" (twocolors remix) – 3:01
"Girl like Me" (twocolors extended) – 4:11

Credits and personnel
Credits adapted from Tidal and Translation album notes.

Recording and management
 Recorded at Future Labs (Los Angeles, California, United States and United Kingdom)
 Will2Manifest Music/Kobalt/Apl De Ap Publishing LLC/TABMagnetic, Inc./MyMPM Music/Sony/ATV MelodySesame Love Music/Negro Sterling Music/Rev Sheet Music Publishing

Personnel

 Black Eyed Peas:
 will.i.am – vocals, songwriting, production
 apl.de.ap – vocals, songwriting
 Taboo – vocals, songwriting
 Shakira – vocals, backing vocals, songwriting, co-production
 Olgui Chirino – backing vocals
 Brendan Buckley – songwriting
 Albert Menendez – songwriting
 Tim Mitchell – songwriting
 Johnny Goldstein – co-production
 Roger Rodés – engineering
 Dave Clauss – engineering, 
 Dylan "3-D" Dresdow – engineering, mixing, mastering

Charts

Weekly charts

Year-end charts

Certifications

Release history

See also
List of Billboard Hot Latin Songs and Latin Airplay number ones of 2021

References

2020 singles
Black Eyed Peas songs
Shakira songs
2020 songs
Spanglish songs
Songs written by will.i.am
Songs written by Shakira
Songs written by apl.de.ap
Songs written by Taboo (rapper)
Song recordings produced by will.i.am
Music videos directed by Rich Lee